Katja Hessel (born 5 May 1972) is a German lawyer and politician of the Free Democratic Party (FDP) who has been serving as a member of the Bundestag from the state of Bavaria since 2017.

In addition to her parliamentary work, Hessel has been serving as Parliamentary State Secretary in the Federal Ministry of Finance in the coalition government of Chancellor Olaf Scholz since 2021.

Early life and career 
Hessel was born in Nuremberg in 1972. In 1991, she passed her Abitur and then studied law in Erlangen until 1996. She passed her first state examination in 1996 and her second in 1998. 

Kessel started working as a lawyer in her own law firm in 1999 and became a tax consultant in 2002.

Political career 
In 1999, Hessel joined the FDP. She was a State Secretary in the Bavarian State Ministry of Economic Affairs, Infrastructure, Transport and Technology under minister Martin Zeil in the government of Minister-President Horst Seehofer from 2008 to 2013. 

Hessel became a member of the Bundestag in the 2017 German federal election, representing the Nuremberg North district. From 2018 until 2021, she was a member of the Finance Committee, which she chaired from 2020.

In addition to her committee assignments, Hessel is part of the German-Japanese Parliamentary Friendship Group.

In the negotiations to form a so-called traffic light coalition of the Social Democratic Party (SPD), the Green Party and the FDP following the 2021 federal elections, Hessel was part of her party's delegation in the working group on financial regulation and the national budget, co-chaired by Doris Ahnen, Lisa Paus and Christian Dürr.

Other activities

Corporate boards 
 Deutsche Telekom, Member of the Supervisory Board (since 2022)

Non-profit organizations 
 Federal Foundation for the Reappraisal of the SED Dictatorship, Member of the Board of Trustees (since 2022)
 German Federal Environmental Foundation (DBU), Member of the Board of Trustees (since 2022)
 Max Planck Institute for Tax Law and Public Finance, Member of the Board of Trustees (since 2022)
 Kiwanis, Member

References

External links 

  
 Bundestag biography 
 

1971 births
Living people
Members of the Bundestag for Bavaria
Female members of the Bundestag
21st-century German women politicians
Members of the Bundestag 2021–2025
Members of the Bundestag 2017–2021
Members of the Bundestag for the Free Democratic Party (Germany)
University of Erlangen-Nuremberg alumni
Politicians from Nuremberg
German women lawyers
21st-century German lawyers